Delias schoenbergi is a butterfly in the family Pieridae. It was described by Walter Rothschild in 1895. It is found in the Australasian realm.

The wingspan is about 65–70 mm.

Subspecies
D. s. schoenbergi (Bougainville)
D. s. choiseuli Rothschild, 1904 (Choiseul)
D. s. isabellae Rothschild & Jordan, 1901 (Santa Isabel)

Etymology
The species is named for Wolf von Schönberg a collector from Naumburg who acquired specimens from German colonists in Borneo (1889/90), German New Guinea and the Bismarck Archipelago (1892/1902).

References

External links
Delias at Markku Savela's Lepidoptera and Some Other Life Forms

schoenbergi
Butterflies described in 1895